Sylvester Gardenzio Stallone (born July 6, 1946) is an American actor and filmmaker. After his beginnings as a struggling actor for a number of years upon arriving to New York City in 1969 and later Hollywood in 1974, he won his first critical acclaim as an actor for his co-starring role as Stanley Rosiello in The Lords of Flatbush. Stallone subsequently found gradual work as an extra or side character in films with a sizable budget until he achieved his greatest critical and commercial success as an actor and screenwriter, starting in 1976 with his role as boxer Rocky Balboa, in the first film of the successful Rocky series (1976–present), for which he also wrote the screenplays. In the films, Rocky is portrayed as an underdog boxer who fights numerous brutal opponents, and wins the world heavyweight championship twice.

In 1977, Stallone was the third actor in cinema to be nominated for two Academy Awards for Best Original Screenplay and Best Actor. Stallone's film Rocky was inducted into the National Film Registry, and had its props placed in the Smithsonian Museum. Stallone's use of the front entrance to the Philadelphia Museum of Art in the Rocky series led the area to be nicknamed the Rocky Steps. Philadelphia has a statue of the Rocky character placed permanently near the museum, and he was voted into the International Boxing Hall of Fame.

Up until 1982, Stallone's films were not big box-office successes unless they were Rocky sequels, and none received the critical acclaim achieved with the first Rocky. This changed with the successful action film First Blood in which he portrayed the PTSD-plagued soldier John Rambo. Originally an adaptation of the eponymous novel by David Morell, First Blood’s script was significantly altered by Stallone during the film’s production. Stallone would play the role in a total of five Rambo films (1982–2019). From the mid-1980s through to the late 1990s, Stallone would go on to become one of Hollywood's highest-paid actors of that era by appearing in a slew of commercially successful action films which were however generally panned by critics. These include Cobra, Tango and Cash, Cliffhanger, the better received Demolition Man, and The Specialist.

Stallone saw a decline in popularity in the early 2000s but rebounded back to prominence in 2006 with a sixth installment in the Rocky series and 2008 with a fourth in the Rambo series. In the 2010s, Stallone launched The Expendables films series (2010–2014), in which he played the lead as the mercenary Barney Ross. In 2013, he starred in the successful Escape Plan, and acted in its sequels. In 2015, Stallone returned to the Rocky series with Creed, that serve as spin-off films focusing on Adonis "Donnie" Creed played by Michael B. Jordan, the son of the ill-fated boxer Apollo Creed, to whom the long-retired Rocky is a mentor. Reprising the role brought Stallone praise, and his first Golden Globe award for the first Creed, as well as a third Oscar nomination, having been first nominated for the same role 40 years prior. Since 2022, he has starred in the critically acclaimed television series Tulsa King for Paramount+. 

Stallone is the only actor in the history of American cinema to have starred in a box-office number-one film across six consecutive decades. He is also one of the most renowned physical culture icons in history.

Early life
Sylvester Stallone was born in the Hell's Kitchen neighborhood of Manhattan, New York City on July 6, 1946, the elder son of Francesco "Frank" Stallone Sr., a hairdresser and beautician, and Jacqueline "Jackie" Stallone (née Labofish; 1921–2020), an astrologer, dancer, and promoter of women's wrestling. His Italian father was born in Gioia del Colle, Apulia, Italy and moved to the U.S. in the 1930s, while his American mother is of French (Breton) and Ashkenazi Jewish descent. His younger brother is actor and musician Frank Stallone.

Many biographies of Stallone indicate that his birth name is Michael Sylvester Gardenzio Stallone. However, Stallone's mother explained in an interview that she originally named him Tyrone because she admired the actor Tyrone Power, but Stallone's father changed it to Sylvester. His nickname as a child was "Binky", but after schoolmates began calling him "Stinky", Stallone chose to go by the nickname of Mike/Michael. His middle name "Gardenzio" is a deformation of the Italian given name "Gaudenzio"; Stallone usually shortened it to "Enzio".

Complications during labor forced his mother’s obstetricians to use two pairs of forceps during his birth; misuse of these forceps accidentally severed a nerve and caused paralysis in parts of Stallone's face. This caused paralysis of the lower left side of his face (including parts of his lip, tongue, and chin), an accident which gave him his signature snarling look and slurred speech. As a result, he was bullied as a child and so he coped with bodybuilding and acting.

He was baptized Catholic. His father moved the family to Washington, D.C., in the early 1950s to open a beauty school. In 1954, his mother opened a women's gym called Barbella's.

Education
Stallone attended Notre Dame Academy and Abraham Lincoln High School in Philadelphia, and Charlotte Hall Military Academy in Charlotte Hall, Maryland, prior to attending Miami Dade College.

He spent two years, from September 1965 to June 1967, at the American College of Switzerland. He returned to the United States to study as a drama major at the University of Miami, from 1967 to 1969.

After Stallone's request that his acting and life experiences be accepted in exchange for his remaining needed college credits to graduate, he was granted a Bachelor of Fine Arts (BFA) degree by the president of the University of Miami in 1999.

Film and stage career

Early roles to breakthrough: 1968–1976 
Until 1969, he appeared on the stage under the name Mike Stallone; in 1970, he started using the stage name Sylvester E. Stallone. While attending the University of Miami, Stallone had a role in the drama That Nice Boy (aka The Square Root), filmed in 1968.

Stallone had his first starring role in the softcore pornography feature film The Party at Kitty and Stud's (1970). He was paid  for two days' work. Stallone later explained that he had done the film out of desperation after being evicted from his apartment and finding himself homeless for several days. He has also said that he slept three weeks in the Port Authority Bus Terminal in New York City prior to seeing a casting notice for the film. In the actor's words, "it was either do that movie or rob someone, because I was at the end – the very end – of my rope". The film was released several years later as Italian Stallion, in order to cash in on Stallone's newfound fame (the new title was taken from Stallone's nickname since Rocky). Stallone also starred in the erotic off-Broadway stage play Score which ran for 23 performances at the Martinique Theatre from October 28 to November 15, 1971, and was later made into the 1974 film Score by Radley Metzger.

After moving to New York City, Stallone shared an apartment with his girlfriend, Sasha Czack, an aspiring actress who supported them by working as a waitress. Stallone took odd jobs around this time, including being a cleaner at a zoo, and a movie theater usher; he was fired from the latter for scalping tickets. He furthered his writing skills by frequenting a local library, and became interested in the works of Edgar Allan Poe.

In 1972, Stallone was on the verge of giving up on having an acting career; in what he later described as a low point, he tried and failed to get a job as an extra in The Godfather. Instead, he was relegated to a background role in another Hollywood hit, What's Up, Doc?, starring Barbra Streisand. Stallone is hardly visible in his two appearances.

Stallone happened to be acting in a play that a friend invited him to partake in, and an agent in attendance thought that Stallone fit the role of Stanley, a main character in The Lords of Flatbush, which had a start-stop schedule from 1972 to 1974 over budget issues. Stallone, around mid-1973, achieved his first proper starring role, in the independent film No Place to Hide, playing a man who is associated with a New York-based urban terrorist movement, with a jewelry-seller as his love interest. The film was re-cut and retitled Rebel years later, this second version featuring Stallone as its star. In 1990, this film was re-edited with outtakes from the original movie and newly shot matching footage, then redubbed – in the style of Woody Allen's What's Up, Tiger Lily? – into a parody of itself titled A Man Called... Rainbo.

Stallone's other first few film roles were minor, and included brief uncredited appearances in MASH (1970), as a soldier sitting at a table; Pigeons (1970), as a party guest; Woody Allen's Bananas (1971), as a subway thug; in the psychological thriller Klute (1971), as an extra dancing in a club; and in the Jack Lemmon film The Prisoner of Second Avenue (1975), as a youth. In the latter film, Jack Lemmon's character chases, tackles, and mugs Stallone, thinking that Stallone's character is a pickpocket. He had his second starring role in 1974, in The Lords of Flatbush. In 1975, he played supporting roles in Farewell, My Lovely; Capone; and Death Race 2000. He made guest appearances on the TV series Police Story and Kojak. He is also supposedly in Mandingo. It is often said that his scene was deleted.

Stallone gained worldwide fame with his starring role in the smash hit Rocky (1976), a sports drama about a struggling boxer, Rocky Balboa, taking on heavyweight champion Apollo Creed. On March 24, 1975, Stallone saw the Muhammad Ali vs. Chuck Wepner fight. That night Stallone went home, and after three days he had completed the first draft of Rocky. Stallone subsequently denied that Wepner provided any inspiration for the script; however, Wepner filed a lawsuit which was eventually settled with Stallone for an undisclosed amount. Other possible inspirations for the film may have included Rocky Graziano's autobiography Somebody Up There Likes Me, and the movie of the same name. Stallone attempted to sell the script to multiple studios, with the intention of playing the lead role himself. Irwin Winkler and Robert Chartoff became interested and offered Stallone  for the rights, but they had their own casting ideas for the lead role, including Robert Redford and Burt Reynolds. Stallone refused to sell unless he played the lead character—and, eventually, after a substantial budget cut to compromise, it was agreed he could be the star. Upon its release, critic Roger Ebert stated that Stallone could become the next Marlon Brando.

In 1977, at the 49th Academy Awards, Rocky was nominated for ten Oscars, including Best Actor and Best Original Screenplay nominations for Stallone. The film went on to win the Academy Awards for Best Picture, Best Directing, and Best Film Editing.

Subsequent success: 1978–1999 

Stallone made his directorial debut and starred in the 1978 film Paradise Alley, a family drama in which he played one of three brothers who get involved in professional wrestling. That same year, he starred in Norman Jewison's F.I.S.T., a social drama in which he plays a warehouse worker, very loosely modeled on James Hoffa, who becomes involved in labor union leadership.

In 1979, he wrote, starred, and directed (replacing John G. Avildsen) in Rocky II. The sequel became a major success, grossing  million.

In 1981, he starred alongside Michael Caine and soccer star Pelé in Escape to Victory, a sports drama in which he plays a prisoner of war involved in a Nazi propaganda soccer game. That same year, he starred in the thriller Nighthawks, in which he plays a New York city cop who plays a cat-and-mouse game with a foreign terrorist, played by Rutger Hauer.

In 1982, Stallone starred as Vietnam veteran John Rambo, a former Green Beret, in the action film First Blood, which was both a critical and box-office success. Critics praised Stallone's performance, saying he made Rambo seem human, as opposed to the way he is portrayed in the book of the same name. It launched the Rambo franchise. That year Rocky III was released in which Stallone wrote, directed, and starred. The third sequel became a box-office success. In preparation for these roles, Stallone embarked upon a vigorous training regimen, which often meant six days a week in the gym and further sit-ups in the evenings. Stallone claims to have reduced his body fat percentage to his all-time low of 2.8% for Rocky III.

In 1983, he directed Staying Alive, the sequel to Saturday Night Fever, starring John Travolta. This was the only film Stallone directed that he did not star in. Staying Alive was universally panned by film critics. Despite being a critical failure, Staying Alive was a commercial success. The film opened with the biggest weekend for a musical film ever (at the time) with a gross of $12,146,143 from 1,660 screens. Overall, the film grossed nearly $65 million in the US box office against its $22 million budget. Worldwide it grossed $127 million. Though the US box-office intake was significantly less than the $139.5 million earned by Saturday Night Fever, the film nevertheless ranked in the top ten most financially successful films of 1983.

During the 1980s, Stallone was considered one of the biggest action film stars in the world, along with Arnold Schwarzenegger. The Schwarzenegger-Stallone rivalry continued for years, they attacked each other in the press, and tried to surpass the other with more on-screen killings and larger weapons. 

Stallone occasionally attempted, albeit unsuccessfully, roles in different genres. In 1984, he co-wrote and starred alongside Dolly Parton in the comedy film Rhinestone, where he played a wannabe country music singer. For the Rhinestone soundtrack, he performed a song. Stallone turned down the lead male role in Romancing the Stone in order to make Rhinestone instead, a decision he later regretted.

In 1985, Stallone continued his success with the Rocky and Rambo franchises with Rocky IV and Rambo: First Blood Part II. Stallone has portrayed these two characters in a total of 13 films. Stallone met former Mr. Olympia Franco Columbu to develop his character's appearance for the films Rocky IV, just as if he were preparing for the Mr. Olympia competition. That meant two workouts a day, six days a week. Both films were major financial successes.

It was around 1985 that Stallone was signed to a remake of the 1939 James Cagney classic Angels With Dirty Faces. The film would form part of his multi-picture deal with Cannon Films and was to co-star Christopher Reeve and be directed by Menahem Golan. The re-making of such a beloved classic was met with disapproval by Variety and horror by top critic Roger Ebert. Cannon opted to make the action film Cobra which was released in 1986 and became a box-office success. It led to the setting up of his production company White Eagle Enterprises.

In 1987, he starred in the family drama Over the Top as a struggling trucker who tries to make amends with his estranged son and enters an arm wrestling competition. This was poorly received by critics and was a box-office failure. In 1989, he co-starred alongside Kurt Russell in the buddy cop action film Tango & Cash, which did solid business domestically and overseas, grossing  million in foreign markets and over  million worldwide.

Stallone became a boxing promoter in the 1980s. His boxing promoting company, Tiger Eye Productions, signed world champion boxers Sean O'Grady and Aaron Pryor.

Stallone began the 1990s starring in the fifth installment of the Rocky franchise, Rocky V. This film brought back the first film's director, John G. Avildsen, and was intended to be the final installment in the series. It was considered a box-office disappointment and received negative reviews.

Stallone next appeared in John Landis' period comedy Oscar which was both a critical and box-office failure. In 1992, he appeared in Roger Spottiswoode's action comedy Stop! Or My Mom Will Shoot which was also both a critical and box-office disaster. Stallone signed onto the film based on rumors that Schwarzenegger was interested in the lead. Schwarzenegger said that, knowing the script's quality was poor, he publicly faked interest in starring for producers to lure Stallone.

In 1993, he made a comeback with Renny Harlin's action thriller Cliffhanger. which was a success in the US, grossing  million, and worldwide, grossing  million. Later that year, he starred in the futuristic action film Demolition Man directed by Marco Brambilla, co-starring Wesley Snipes and Sandra Bullock. On Rotten Tomatoes the film has an approval rating of 60% based on 42 reviews, with an average rating of 5.43/10. The site's consensus reads: "A better-than-average sci-fi shoot-em-up with a satirical undercurrent, Demolition Man is bolstered by strong performances by Stallone, Snipes, and Bullock." The film debuted at No. 1 at the box office. Demolition Man grossed $58,055,768 by the end of its box-office run in North America and $159,055,768 worldwide.

His string of hits continued with 1994's The Specialist co-starring Sharon Stone and directed by Luis Llosa, which opened in the U.S. on October 7. While the critical reception was overwhelmingly negative, the film was a commercial success. In its opening weekend it made $14,317,765 and ended up making back its budget with $57,362,582 at the domestic box office while making another $113,000,000 overseas, giving it a worldwide gross of $170,362,582. 

In 1995, he played the title character (from the British comic book 2000 AD) in the science fiction action film Judge Dredd. His overseas box-office appeal saved the domestic box-office disappointment of Judge Dredd, which cost almost  million and barely made its budget back, with a worldwide tally of  million. Despite the film's poor box-office performance, Stallone signed a three-picture deal with Universal Pictures for $60 million, making him the second star after Jim Carrey to receive $20 million per film. The deal expired in February 2000 without him making any films, however, so he received no payment.

That year, he also appeared in the thriller Assassins with Julianne Moore and Antonio Banderas. That same year, Stallone, along with an all-star cast of celebrities, appeared in the Trey Parker and Matt Stone short comedy film "Your Studio and You" commissioned by the Seagram Company for a party celebrating their acquisition of Universal Studios and the MCA Corporation. Stallone speaks in his Rocky Balboa voice with subtitles translating what he is saying. At one point, Stallone starts yelling about how can they use his Balboa character, that he left it in the past; the narrator calms him with a wine cooler and calling him "brainiac." In response, Stallone says, "Thank you very much." He then looks at the wine cooler and exclaims, "Stupid cheap studio!"

In 1996, he starred in the disaster film Daylight as a disgraced former emergency services chief who attempts to rescue survivors of an underground tunnel explosion. Daylight also underperformed at the domestic box office, grossing $33 million, but did better overseas and grossed a total of $158 million worldwide.

In 1997, Stallone was cast against type as an overweight sheriff in the crime drama Cop Land in which he starred alongside Robert De Niro and Ray Liotta. The film was critically well-received and was a modest success at the box office, earning $63 million on a $15 million budget, and Stallone's performance earned him the Stockholm International Film Festival Best Actor Award.

In 1998, he did voice-over work for the computer-animated film Antz, which was a big hit domestically.

Declining years: 2000–2005 
In 2000, Stallone starred in the thriller Get Carter, a remake of the 1971 British film of the same name, but the film was poorly received by both critics and audiences. Stallone's career declined considerably after his subsequent films Driven (2001), Avenging Angelo (2002) and D-Tox (2002) were also critical and commercial failures.

In 2003, he played a villainous role in the third installment of the Spy Kids series: Spy Kids 3-D: Game Over, which was a huge box-office success (almost  million worldwide). Stallone also had a cameo appearance in the 2003 French film Taxi 3 as a passenger. Also that year, Stallone started to regain prominence for his supporting role in the neo-noir crime drama Shade which was only released in a limited fashion but was praised by critics. He was also attached to star and direct a film tentatively titled Rampart Scandal, which was to be about the murder of rappers Tupac Shakur and The Notorious B.I.G. and the surrounding Los Angeles Police Department corruption scandal. It was later titled Notorious but was shelved.

In 2005, alongside Sugar Ray Leonard, he was the co-presenter of the NBC reality television boxing competition series The Contender. That same year he also made a guest appearance in two episodes of the television series Las Vegas. That year, Stallone also inducted professional wrestling icon Hulk Hogan, who appeared in Rocky III as a wrestler named Thunderlips, into the WWE Hall of Fame; Stallone was also the person who offered Hogan the cameo in Rocky III. In August, Stallone released his book Sly Moves which claimed to be a guide to fitness and nutrition as well as a candid insight into his life and works from his own perspective. The book also contained many photographs of Stallone throughout the years as well as pictures of him performing exercises.

Return to success: 2006–present 

After a three-year hiatus from films, Stallone had a comeback in 2006 with the sixth installment of his successful Rocky series, Rocky Balboa, which was a critical and commercial hit. After the critical and box-office failure of the previous installment Rocky V, Stallone had decided to write, direct and star in a sixth installment which would be a more appropriate climax to the series. The total domestic box office came to .3 million (and  million worldwide). The budget of the movie was only  million. His performance in Rocky Balboa has been praised and garnered mostly positive reviews. That year, the development Death Wish remake began, when Stallone announced that he would be directing and starring in a remake of the 1974 film. Stallone said, "Instead of the Charles Bronson character being an architect, my version would have him as a very good cop who had incredible success without ever using his gun. So when the attack on his family happens, he's really thrown into a moral dilemma in proceeding to carry out his revenge." He later told the publication that he was no longer involved. In a 2009 interview with MTV, though, Stallone stated that he was again considering the project. However the role went to Bruce Willis with Eli Roth as director.

Stallone partnered with a beverage company producing an upscale bottled water brand called Sly Water.

In 2008, Stallone reprised his other famous role as Rambo with the fourth installment of his other successful movie franchise which was titled simply Rambo (John Rambo in some countries where the first movie was titled Rambo). Its box office was  worldwide with a budget of  million.

In July 2009, Stallone made a cameo appearance in the Bollywood movie Kambakkht Ishq, where he played himself. 

It was announced on December 7, 2010, that Stallone was voted into the International Boxing Hall of Fame in the non-participant category.

Also that year, Stallone wrote, directed and starred in the ensemble action film The Expendables. The movie, which was filmed during summer/winter 2009, was released on August 13, 2010. Joining him in the film were fellow action stars Jason Statham, Jet Li, and Dolph Lundgren, as well as Terry Crews, Mickey Rourke, Randy Couture, Eric Roberts, and Stone Cold Steve Austin, and cameos by fellow '80s action icons Bruce Willis and Arnold Schwarzenegger. The movie took  in its opening weekend, going straight in at No. 1 in the US box office. The figure marked the biggest opening weekend in Stallone's career. In summer 2010, Brazilian company O2 Filmes released a statement saying it was still owed more than  million for its work on the film. In 2011, Stallone provided the voice of a lion in Kevin James' comedy Zookeeper.

The Expendables 2 was released August 17, 2012; the sequel received a positive critical reception of 67% on Rotten Tomatoes, as opposed to the original's 41%. As well as returning cast members from the first film, the ensemble cast also included Jean-Claude Van Damme and Chuck Norris. That year, Stallone co-wrote the book for the Broadway musical adaptation of Rocky.

In 2013, Stallone starred in the action film Bullet to the Head, directed by Walter Hill, based upon Alexis Nolent's French graphic novel Du Plomb Dans La Tete. Also in 2013, he starred in the action thriller Escape Plan, along with Arnold Schwarzenegger and Jim Caviezel, and in the sports comedy drama Grudge Match alongside Robert De Niro, harkening back to the Rocky franchise. Stallone was reported to be developing an English-language remake of the Spanish film No Rest for the Wicked, though the project was shelved. That year Stallone was credited as writer for the Jason Statham action film vehicle Homefront.

The Expendables 3, the third installment in the ensemble action film series, was released on August 15, 2014. The returning ensemble cast also added Wesley Snipes, Antonio Banderas, Mel Gibson and Harrison Ford. This film was negatively received by both critics and audiences and became the lowest-grossing film in the series.

In 2015, Stallone reprised his role as Rocky Balboa in a spin-off-sequel film, Creed, which focused on Adonis "Donnie" Creed, the son of his deceased friend/rival, Apollo Creed, becoming a professional boxer, played by Michael B. Jordan. The film, directed by Ryan Coogler, received critical acclaim. Portraying the iconic cinematic boxer for the seventh time in a span of 40 years, Stallone's portrayal of the character received widespread acclaim and accolades, including the Golden Globe Award for Best Supporting Actor, and his third Academy Award nomination, this time for Best Supporting Actor.

In 2017, Stallone appeared in Guardians of the Galaxy Vol. 2 as Stakar Ogord / Starhawk, the leader of a Ravagers faction. In 2018, he co-starred in Escape Plan 2: Hades with Dave Bautista which was released straight to home-video. Upon wrapping production, he announced via his social media page that work on Escape Plan 3: Devil's Station began immediately thereafter. In July, Stallone announced that he had finished a script for a sequel to Creed, with a plot including the return of Ivan Drago from Rocky IV. That year, Stallone was featured in Derek Wayne Johnson's John G. Avildsen: King of the Underdogs, a documentary about director John G. Avildsen.

Creed II went into production in March 2018, with a scheduled release on Thanksgiving 2018. Stallone was originally slated to direct before the appointment of Steven Caple Jr., in his feature film directorial debut. Creed II was released in the United States by Metro-Goldwyn-Mayer on November 21, 2018. The film received generally positive reviews from critics and it went on to debut to $35.3 million in its opening weekend (a five-day total of $55.8 million), marking the biggest debut ever for a live-action release over Thanksgiving.

On July 23, 2019, in an interview with Variety, Stallone said that a Rocky sequel and prequel are in development. Producer Irwin Winkler said "We're very high on it" and that negotiations are underway for Stallone to write and star in the feature. "We're very anxious to make it." Stallone said the plot of the movie would be about Rocky befriending a young fighter who is an undocumented immigrant. "Rocky meets a young, angry person who got stuck in this country when he comes to see his sister. He takes him into his life, and unbelievable adventures begin, and they wind up south of the border. It's very, very timely." Stallone said. Stallone also said there are "ongoing discussions" about a Rocky prequel television series, which he hopes will land on a streaming service and the series will likely follow a young Rocky Balboa as a professional boxing hopeful. Stallone said producer Irwin Winkler is hesitant on making the series saying that "There was some conflict there, yes. He felt in his mind that "Rocky" was primarily a feature film, and he didn't see it as being translated for cable, so there was a big bone of contention." That year, Stallone hand-picked Derek Wayne Johnson to direct and produce a documentary on the making of the original Rocky, entitled 40 Years of Rocky (2020). The documentary features Stallone narrating behind-the-scenes footage from the making of the film.

Stallone formed a film studio named Balboa Productions with Braden Aftergood in March 2018, where Stallone will serve as co-producer for each of their projects. The studio signed a multi-year collaboration deal with Starlight Culture Entertainment to develop projects for film and television. In May 2018, a fifth installment in the Rambo franchise was announced, and in August 2018, Adrian Grünberg was confirmed as the director. Rambo: Last Blood began filming by September 2018, with a script co-written by Stallone, who also reprised his role as Vietnam War veteran John Rambo. The plot centers around Rambo infiltrating a Mexican drug cartel to rescue a family friend's daughter. The film, which was released on September 20, 2019, in the United States, grossed $18.9 million in its opening weekend, the best debut of the franchise. The film grossed $91 million worldwide against a production budget of $50 million.

In late 2020, Stallone lent his voice as Rambo to the fighting video game Mortal Kombat 11, as part of the game's 2nd Kombat Pack. In 2021, he voiced King Shark in the DC Extended Universe film The Suicide Squad.

In 2022, Stallone starred in Samaritan, a dark interpretation of the superhero genre, from a script written by Bragi Schut. 

In November 2022, Stallone made his streaming television debut in Tulsa King, in which he plays a Mafia boss. The 8 episode series was created by Taylor Sheridan and Terence Winter and premiered on Paramount+.

Works in development 
Following the releases of Creed II and Rambo V: Last Blood, Balboa Productions has had an extensive production slate. A film depicting the history of Jack "Galveston Giant" Johnson, the first African-American boxing heavyweight champion, is in development. The project was announced after Stallone's instrumental involvement in helping get Johnson a posthumous pardon from US President Donald Trump.

In 2023, Stallone will reprise his role as Stakar Ogord in Guardians of the Galaxy Vol. 3.

Stallone will later star in the film adaptation of Hunter, a story which had originally been planned as the premise for Rambo V: Last Blood. The story centers around Nathaniel Hunter, a professional tracker who is hired to hunt a half-human beast created as an experiment of a secret agency. The studio has yet to hire a screenwriter. A feature-length adaptation of the biographical novel Ghost: My Thirty Years as an FBI Undercover Agent by Michael McGowan and Ralph Pezzullo about McGowan's career of over 50 undercover missions will follow, though there is no screenwriter attached to the project yet. Additionally, a film centered around black ops troops, being written by retired Army Ranger Max Adams, is also in development.

The television production slate includes Levon's Trade created by Chuck Dixon and a series adaptation of Charles Sailor's Second Son being written by Rob Williams.

Stallone will star in The Expendables 4, the fourth installment of the action film series. Stallone also announced in early May 2020 that a sequel to 1993's Demolition Man is in the works: "I think it's coming. We're working on it right now with Warner Brothers. It's looking fantastic. So, that should come out, that's going to happen".

Stallone has continued to express his passion in directing a film on Edgar Allan Poe's life, a script he has been preparing for years. He has also mentioned that he would like to adapt Nelson DeMille's novel The Lion's Game.

Multiple tasks in media
In 1977, for the first Rocky, Stallone became the third man in history to receive the two nominations for best actor and best screenplay, after Charlie Chaplin and Orson Welles. Like the aforementioned he wrote and took on the leading role in the film. Stallone is known for his recurring roles as Rocky Balboa, John Rambo, and Barney Ross. Stallone wrote and starred in all of six Rocky films, while taking on the task of directing in four of the sequels. Stallone starred and co-wrote the five films of the Rambo franchise, and the fourth one he also directed. Stallone wrote, directed and took the lead role in the first installment of The Expendables films. Stallone directed, starred and wrote in Paradise Alley. John Travolta starred in Staying Alive, a sequel of Saturday Night Fever, which Stallone wrote and directed. Stallone wrote and starred in Cobra, and Driven. Stallone co-wrote and starred in F.I.S.T., Rhinestone, Over the Top, Cliffhanger, and Creed II.

Asked in February 2008 which of the icons (Rocky or Rambo) he would rather be remembered for, Stallone said "it's a tough one, but Rocky is my first baby, so Rocky." He also stated that Rocky could be interpreted as the "conscious" and Rambo as the "unconscious" of the same character.

Stallone has occasionally sung in his films. He sang "Too Close to Paradise" for Paradise Alley (1978), with the music provided by Bill Conti (who also collaborated with Stallone in prior years, having recorded the famous "Gonna Fly Now" theme for his Academy Award-nominated film, Rocky (1976) which was a U.S. No. 1 hit). In Rocky III (1982), Stallone (as Rocky Balboa) sang "Take Me Back" to his on-screen wife, Adrian (Talia Shire), as they lay in bed. The song was first performed by singer and younger brother, Frank, who had a small role in the original Rocky. For Rhinestone (1984), Stallone sang such songs as "Drinkenstein" as well as duets with his co-star, and actual country music star, Dolly Parton. He also performed two songs when he guest-starred on The Muppet Show in the 1980s, at the height of his career. The last time Stallone sang in a film was in Grudge Match (2013) when he and Robert De Niro performed "The Star-Spangled Banner" together.

Personal life

Marriages and children 
Stallone has been married three times. He has two sons from his first marriage and three daughters from his third marriage. 

At age 28, on December 28, 1974, he married Sasha Czack. They had two sons, Sage Moonblood Stallone (1976–2012), who died of heart disease at age 36, and Seargeoh (born 1979), who was diagnosed with autism at an early age. The couple divorced on February 14, 1985. 

Stallone married model and actress Brigitte Nielsen on December 15, 1985, in Beverly Hills, California. Their marriage (which lasted two years) and their subsequent divorce were highly publicized by the tabloid press. 

In 1988 Stallone met model Jennifer Flavin and they were in a relationship until 1994, when Stallone told her he was having a child with model Janice Dickinson. After the February 1994 birth, DNA tests confirmed he was not the father and Stallone ended his engagement to Dickinson. After a brief 1995 engagement with model Angie Everhart, he and Flavin rekindled their relationship.

In May 1997, Stallone and Jennifer Flavin married. The couple has three daughters, Sophia, Sistine, and Scarlet. His daughters were chosen to share the role of Golden Globe Ambassador at the 74th Golden Globe Awards. In August 19, 2022, Palm Beach County records showed that after 25 years of marriage, Jennifer Flavin had filed for "dissolution of marriage and other relief."  On September 23, 2022, the couple reconciled.

Family and friends 
Stallone maintains a relationship with his brother Frank who contributed the theme songs to Rambo: First Blood Part II, and Staying Alive. In 1983, Frank's song "Far from Over", for Staying Alive, reached the #10 U.S. hit. Frank appears in minor roles, bit parts, and provides music in many films starring Sylvester, most notably in the Rocky films, where Frank played a street corner singer and contributed songs.

Stallone's 48-year-old half-sister, Toni Ann Filiti, died of lung cancer on August 26, 2012. She died at their mother's Santa Monica home after choosing to leave UCLA's hospital.

He was a close friend of Joe Spinell. They had a falling out during the shooting of their final collaboration Nighthawks (1982).

Injuries
Known for physically demanding roles and his willingness to do the majority of his own stunts, Stallone has suffered various injuries during his acting career.  During the filming of Escape to Victory, he broke a finger trying to save a penalty kick from Pelé. For a scene in Rocky IV, he told Dolph Lundgren, "Punch me as hard as you can in the chest." He later said, "Next thing I know, I was in intensive care at St. John's Hospital for four days. It's stupid!" While filming a fight scene with Steve Austin for The Expendables, he broke his neck, which required the insertion of a metal plate.

Legal issues
In February 2001, an exotic dancer named Margie Carr filed a lawsuit against Stallone, accusing him of rape while at a Santa Monica fitness center where they both worked out on February 26, 2000. A lawyer for Stallone denied the claim, saying she sold the story to Globe the month before the lawsuit.

In 2007, customs officials in Australia discovered 48 vials of the synthetic human growth hormone Jintropin in Stallone's luggage. In a court hearing on May 15, 2007, Stallone pleaded guilty to two charges of possessing a controlled substance.

In 2013, it was reported that Stallone paid a $2 million lump-sum settlement alongside a monthly amount and a trust for psychiatric and medical expenses to his half-sister Toni-Ann Filiti in 1987. Filiti threatened to file a lawsuit accusing him of abuse. Representatives for Stallone and Filiti's mother Jacqueline Stallone denied the allegations, accusing Filiti of blackmailing him and being a drug addict. However, Filiti's son, Edd Filiti, supported the claims, saying his mother "screamed about" abuse at the hands of her half-brother "over and over," before her death in 2012.

In 2016, a report from the Las Vegas Metropolitan Police Department was published stating that Stallone was accused of sexual assault by a 16-year-old girl while he was shooting a film in Las Vegas in 1986. The teen reportedly said that Stallone, then 40, forced her into a threesome with his bodyguard. A spokeswoman for Stallone denied the allegation. Stallone's ex-wife, Brigitte Nielsen, later came to his defense, saying that she was with him at the time of the alleged assault. Stallone's Over the Top costar David Mendenhall also defended Stallone, denying claims that he introduced Stallone to the girl in question.

In November 2017, a woman accused Stallone of sexually assaulting her at his Santa Monica office in the early 1990s. Stallone denied the claim. His attorney revealed the accuser filed a report after an entertainment website declined to pick up the story. Stallone's attorneys also stated that while the actor had a consensual relationship with the accuser in 1987, they had two witnesses who refuted the claims. In June 2018, the Los Angeles District Attorney's office confirmed an investigation, stating that the Santa Monica Police Department had presented a sex crimes case against Stallone to a special prosecution task force for review. In October 2018, the Los Angeles District Attorney's office made the decision not to charge Stallone for the alleged assault, as no witnesses corroborated the allegations. Stallone in turn filed a police report regarding her lying on an official document.

Religious beliefs
Stallone was raised a devout Catholic, but stopped going to church as his acting career progressed. Later, he rediscovered his childhood faith, when his daughter was born ill in 1996, and he again became a strict Catholic.

In late 2006, Stallone was interviewed by Pat Robertson from the CBN's The 700 Club. Stallone stated that before, in Hollywood, temptation abounded and he had "lost his way", but later put things "in God's hands".

In 2010, he was interviewed by GQ magazine, to which he said that he considered himself a spiritual man, but was not part of any organized church institution.

Upon advice of a Vedic scholar, Stallone performed a 'Tithi Shradh' ritual (done for those who died by accident or murder) at Haridwar for his son Sage.

Political views
Stallone has supported several Republican politicians, but does not identify as a member of the Republican Party.

In 1994, he contributed $1,000 to the campaign of then-Congressman Rick Santorum, who was then running for the United States Senate in Pennsylvania. He has also donated to the Democratic National Committee and to Democrats Joe Biden and Chris Dodd.

In 2008, Stallone endorsed John McCain for that year's presidential election. In the 2016 election, he described Donald Trump as a "Dickensian character" and "larger than life," but did not endorse him or any candidate in that year's Republican primary.

In December 2016, he declined an offer to become Chair of the National Endowment for the Arts, citing a desire to work on issues related to veterans.

Despite his otherwise conservative views, Stallone is an advocate for gun control and has been described as "the most anti-gun person working in Hollywood today."

Awards and honors

Star on the Hollywood Walk of Fame (1984)
International Boxing Hall of Fame (Class of 2010)
Golden Globe Award for Best Supporting Actor - Motion Picture (2015)
Heart of Hollywood Award from the Board of Governors of the Cedars-Sinai Medical Center (2016)

Filmography

References

External links

 
 

 
1946 births
20th-century American male actors
21st-century American male actors
Action film directors
American boxing promoters
American people of Italian descent
American film producers
American gun control activists
American male film actors
American male screenwriters
American male television actors
American male voice actors
American people of Russian-Jewish descent
American Ashkenazi Jews
American people of Breton descent
American people of French descent
American Roman Catholics
American writers of Italian descent
Best Supporting Actor Golden Globe (film) winners
César Honorary Award recipients
Charlotte Hall Military Academy alumni
David di Donatello winners
Film directors from California
Film directors from Maryland
Film directors from New York City
International Boxing Hall of Fame inductees
Living people
Male actors from Maryland
Male actors from New York City
Male actors from Philadelphia
Miami Dade College alumni
New York (state) Republicans
People from Hell's Kitchen, Manhattan
People from Silver Spring, Maryland
Screenwriters from New York (state)
Television producers from New York City
University of Miami alumni
Writers from Manhattan
Writers from Philadelphia
Writers Guild of America
American people of Ukrainian-Jewish descent